Matilda Rapaport (29 January 1986 – 18 July 2016) was a Swedish alpine free-skier. She was married to Swedish alpine skier Mattias Hargin, and was the niece of Swedish actress Alexandra Rapaport.

Early life

Career
Rapaport was the winner of the Xtreme Verbier event of the Freeride World Tour in 2013.

Death 
On 14 July 2016 Rapaport was involved in an avalanche accident during the filming of a promotional video for Ubisoft's upcoming video game Steep, in Farellones, Chile. She was buried under the snow and fell into a coma. She was brought to a hospital in Santiago de Chile where she died on 18 July 2016.

Filmography

Film

Video games

References

1986 births
2016 deaths
Deaths in avalanches
Swedish female alpine skiers
21st-century Swedish women